La Palma is a Spanish Denominación de Origen Protegida (DOP) for wines that covers the entire island of La Palma, in the Canary Islands, Spain. It acquired its DO in 1994.
There are around 600 ha of vineyards registered with the DOP, planted in a strip along the coast, though the altitude can vary between 200 m and 1,500 m above sea-level. The DOP is divided into three sub-zones.
 Hoyo de Mazo, covering the municipalities of Villa de Mazo, Breña Baja, Breña Alta and Santa Cruz de la Palma, in the high central part of the island
Fuencaliente, covering Fuencaliente, El Paso, Los Llanos de Aridane and Tazacorte, is located in the south of the island
Norte de la Palma, covering Puntallana, San Andrés y Sauces, Barlovento, Garafía, Puntagorda and Tijarafe, is located in the north of the island

Geography and Soils
The soils are rich and fertile and lie over volcanic rock. In some areas they are covered with a layer of volcanic sand. The soils are light, permeable and rich in mineral nutrients with a slightly acidic pH level.

Climate
The climate is temperate and sub-tropical. Mean annual rainfall is 400 mm, though there is a significant difference between the north and south of the island on the one hand and the centre. Wind and storms occasionally cause slight damage to the vines.

Authorised Grape Varieties
The authorised grape varieties are:
 Red: Listán Negro, Bastardo Tinto, Malvasía Rosada, Moscatel Negro, Listán Prieto, Negramoll, Tintilla, Vijariego Negro, Cabernet Sauvignon, and Castellana Negra

 Albillo Criollo, Bastardo Blanco, Bermejuela, Vijariego, Doradilla, Burrablanca, Forastera Blanca, Gual, Listán Blanco, Malvasía Aromática, Moscatel de Alejandría, Pedro Ximénez, Sabro, Torrontés, Verdello

References

External links
 D.O.P. La Palma official website

Wine regions of Spain
Spanish wine
Appellations
Wine classification
Canary Islands cuisine